Teltone Corporation was a telephone communications product manufacturer.

History
Teltone was established in 1968 in Washington. The company produced telecommunications equipment including products that transmitted computer data over telephony infrastructure. Over time, the company increasingly developed and supported industrial monitoring applications and electronic security products. CEO from 2000 was Debra L. Griffith, formerly Teltone CFO.

Fate
Teltone was acquired by Industrial Defender in June 2008, subsequently acquired by Lockheed Martin in March 2014. Both the Teltone and Industrial Defender brands continue.

References

Defunct companies based in Washington (state)
Defunct networking companies
Telecommunications equipment vendors
Telecommunications companies established in 1968
Telecommunications companies disestablished in 2008
Defunct technology companies of the United States
Defunct telecommunications companies of the United States 
American companies established in 1968